Samurai Jack is an American animated television series created by animator Genndy Tartakovsky that aired on Cartoon Network from August 10, 2001, to September 25, 2004. The series follows a feudal Japanese prince trained to be a samurai warrior, who tries to destroy the supernatural evil being Aku to protect his homeland but is teleported into a distant future where Aku rules the world. The young man adopts the name "Jack" after an encounter with the youth of the future, and he embarks on a perpetual quest to return to his own time and undo Aku's tyranny.

Samurai Jack aired for four seasons that span 52 episodes. A fifth season spanning 10 episodes premiered on Adult Swim's Toonami block on March 11, 2017, and concluded on May 20, 2017.

The first four seasons are available on Region 1 DVD. A compilation featuring the first three episodes was released as a stand-alone movie titled Samurai Jack: The Premiere Movie on VHS and DVD on March 19, 2002.

Series overview

Episodes 
All episodes are identified in the credits by Roman numerals, which correspond to the total number of episodes released until the fifth season, which adds 40 to the number of the Season 4 finale, LII (52), to start the numeration of its episodes at XCII (92) (like there were 39 episodes left out, and it represents 3 more seasons with 13 episodes each) and reflect the long passage of time between Season 4 and Season 5. All episodes from the first four seasons also have an alternate, more descriptive title.

Season 1 (2001)

Season 2 (2002)

Season 3 (2002–03)

Season 4 (2003–04)

Season 5 (2017)

References

External links 
 
 

Samurai Jack
Samurai Jack
Samurai Jack
Lists of Cartoon Network television series episodes